Višnjevo  is a village in the municipality of Gusinje, Montenegro.

Demographics 
According to the 2011 census, its population was 60.

References 

Populated places in Gusinje Municipality
Geography of Montenegro